The 1996 Leicester City Council election took place on 2 May 1996 to elect members of Leicester City Council in England. This was on the same day as other local elections.

Summary

|}

References

Leicester
Leicester City Council elections
1990s in Leicestershire